Marvin Johnson (born June 22, 1956) is a retired American basketball player who played two years for the University of New Mexico varsity under coach Norm Ellenberger. A transfer from Howard Junior College, he led the Lobos in scoring in his rookie season in 1976–77. Johnson was chosen on the second round by the Chicago Bulls in the 1978 NBA draft.

Johnson went on to play for the Solent Stars in the English league and was named the circuit's Most Valuable Player in 1981.

References

External links
 The 10 best UNM Lobos Men's basketball players

1956 births
Living people
American expatriate basketball people in the United Kingdom
Basketball players from Louisiana
Chicago Bulls draft picks
Junior college men's basketball players in the United States
New Mexico Lobos men's basketball players
People from DeRidder, Louisiana
Small forwards
American men's basketball players
American expatriate basketball people in the Philippines
Philippine Basketball Association imports
San Miguel Beermen players